Gmina Zebrzydowice is a rural gmina (administrative district) in Cieszyn County, Silesian Voivodeship, southern Poland. It lies in the historical region of Cieszyn Silesia. Its seat is the village of Zebrzydowice.

Villages
Gmina Zebrzydowice contains the villages and settlements of Zebrzydowice, Kaczyce, Kończyce Małe and Marklowice Górne.

Neighbouring gminas
Gmina Zebrzydowice is bordered by the gminas of Hażlach, Jastrzębie-Zdrój, Pawłowice, and Strumień. It also borders the Czech Republic.

Twin towns – sister cities

Gmina Zebrzydowice is twinned with:
 Petrovice u Karviné, Czech Republic

References

External links
 Official website

Zebrzydowice
Cieszyn County
Cieszyn Silesia